Tim Curran may refer to:
Tim Curran (author), American author
Tim Curran (Australian rules footballer), former Australian rules footballer
Tim Curran (rugby union) (born 1984), Australian rugby union footballer
Timmy Curran, surfer
Tim Curran, a fictional character on the TV Series Terra Nova
Tim Curran, former political editor of Roll Call
Tim Curran, plaintiff in Curran v. Mount Diablo Council of the Boy Scouts of America

See also
Tim Curry (disambiguation)